The Chinese YMCA of Hong Kong is a social and charity institution in Hong Kong. It was founded in 1901. It operates several major facilities such as the Wu Kai Sha Youth Village.

History 
The Chinese YMCA of Hong Kong was founded in 1918 by Fok Hing-tong, wife of Cantonese Christian businessman Ma Ying-piu. Chinese YMCA of Hong Kong is different from YMCA of Hong Kong. They are two independent organisations in Hong Kong, both traced back to the same YMCA in England but founded differently and provide different directions of service.

Bridges Street location 
In 1915, architecture firm Shattuck and Hussey was hired by the Chinese YMCA to design its new Bridges Street location and construction began in 1917. The design was typical of the firm's work and indicative of the Chicago School style. It included Hong Kong's first indoor swimming pool, gymnasium with a mezzanine running track, and a variety of conference rooms.

Upon its opening, hosted classes, workshops and lectures for Hong Kong men. In 1941, Japanese forces gained control of the building. In 1966, Chinese YMCA relocated to Waterloo Road in Yau Ma Tei and the building was adapted for use as a hostel and educational purposes.

In 1979, Antiquities Advisory Board (AAB) gave the building a Grade II which was upgraded to Grade I in 2009.

Gallery

References

External links

 Official website of the Chinese YMCA of Hong Kong

YMCA
Youth organisations based in Hong Kong